Alexandra Adamoski , known professionally as Alee, is a Canadian country music singer-songwriter. Alee released her independent debut album, This Road Goes Everywhere, on July 18, 2013. The single "Don't Say You Love Me" reached the Top 25 on the Billboard Canada Country chart, followed by a Top 20 hit with her 2015 single "Moonshine". In August 2013, she won the Canadian Country Music Association's Jiffy Lube FanFest Performance Contest, and was later nominated for the prestigious Rising Star Award in 2016, and Female Artist of the Year in 2017. Her debut label-supported album, Bad Habit, was released in April 2017. She released her third album Feels Like This independently in 2021.

Discography

Studio albums

Extended plays

Singles

Music videos

Awards

|-
| rowspan="7"| 2013
| This Road Goes Everywhere
| ACMA Album of the Year
| rowspan="2" 
|-
| rowspan="2"| Alee
| ACMA Rising Star Award
|-
| ACMA Female Artist of the Year
| 
|-
| rowspan="2"| "Don't Say You Love Me"
| ACMA Song of the Year 
| rowspan="4" 
|-
| Canadian Country Music Awards Songwriter of the Year (second ballot)
|-
| rowspan="4"| Alee
| Canadian Country Music Awards Rising Star Award (second ballot)
|-
| Canadian Country Music Awards Female Artist of the Year (second ballot)
|-
| rowspan="2"| 2014
| ACMA Female Artist of the Year
| 
|-
| Canadian Radio Music Awards Best New Group or Solo Artist: Country
| 
|-
| 2016
| Alee
| Canadian Country Music Awards: Rising Star
| 
|-
| 2017
| Alee
| Canadian Country Music Awards: Female Artist of the Year
| 
|-
| 2017
| Alee
| Alberta Country Music Awards: Female Artist of the Year
| 
|-
| 2017
| Alee
| Alberta Country Music Awards: Album of the Year (Bad Habit)
| 
|-
| 2017
| Alee
| Alberta Country Music Awards: Single of the Year (When I Do)
| 
|-
| 2017
| Alee
| Alberta Country Music Awards: Song of the Year (When I Do)
| 
|-
| 2017
| Alee
| Alberta Country Music Awards: Video of the Year (When I Do)
| 
|-
| 2022
| Alee
| Creative Director of the Year (Feels Like This)
| 
|}

References

External links

1992 births
21st-century Canadian women singers
Canadian women country singers
Canadian country singer-songwriters
Living people
Musicians from Edmonton